The Royal Thai Embassy in London is the diplomatic mission of Thailand in the United Kingdom, located at Queen's Gate. 

Thailand also maintains an Office of the Air Attaché at 2 Victoria Road, South Kensington, an Office of Commercial Attaché at 11 Hertford Street, Mayfair and an Office of Educational Attaché at 28 Prince's Gate, South Kensington.
The Ambassador's Residence is located in a separate building on Tregunter Road, Brompton.

History
It has been located at its current address since 1965. Prior to that it was located at 21-23 Ashburn Place, its home since 1884. 

The building is one of a group of Grade II listed buildings in Queen's Gate, which includes the High Commission of Bangladesh next door.

Gallery

See also
Thailand–United Kingdom relations
Embassy of the United Kingdom, Bangkok

References

External links

Official Facebook Page

Thailand
Diplomatic missions of Thailand
Thailand–United Kingdom relations
Grade II listed houses in the Royal Borough of Kensington and Chelsea
South Kensington